The Rafah terror attack was a terrorist attack conducted by the Islamic State – Sinai Province on an Egyptian Armed Forces checkpoint in Rafah in North Sinai on 7th July 2017 and resulted in the death and injury of 23 Egyptian soldiers, including the high-ranking El-Sa'ka officer, Col. Ahmed Mansi. 46 terrorists were killed and six cars of the militants were destroyed in the attack.

Following the attack, multiple domestic and international reactions condemned the attack.

Responses in Egypt 
Local Egyptian organizations and public figures condemned the attack and praised the military forces. The Egyptian cabinet, Al-Azhar and the Coptic Orthodox Church have all condemned the terrorist attack.

The president Abdel Fattah el-Sisi expressed condolences to the families of the martyrs and ordered a special care to be provided for the injured. He asserted that extremists are trying to undermine Egypt's security and stability while the country is gearing up to eliminate terror threats and to carry out development projects nationwide.

In an official statement, the Egyptian cabinet praised the army for "foiling the attack" and Prime Minister Sherif Ismail offered his condolences to the victims. Ismail stressed the necessity of efforts worldwide joining to confront terrorism and putting an end to the support for terrorism.

The head of the administrative prosecution Rashida Fathullah offered condolences to the families of the victims and wished a speedy recovery for all those injured.

The Egyptian Dar al-Ifta' – the Sunni institution concerning with issuing fatwas and Islamic laws – mourned soldiers killed in the terror attack at the checkpoint.

Al-Azhar also issued a statement condemning the attack; Grand Imam Ahmad el-Tayyeb said that "the pure blood (of the slain soldiers) will be a curse to those cowards and their supporters domestically and internationally, and those who sold their religion and betrayed their nations." El-Tayyeb also called for unified international efforts in countering terrorist groups and those countries which sponsor them. He also called on all Egyptians to stand behind their armed forces and police to defeat terrorism.

The Coptic Orthodox Church headed by Pope Tawadros II and the Evangelical Church also strongly condemned the attack.

International reactions 

Multiple foreign countries and leaders have issued statements condemning the militant attack in North Sinai.

International organizations 
United Nations Secretary-General António Guterres and the Security Council have underscored the need to bring the perpetrators to justice. In a statement attributable to his spokesperson, Mr. Guterres "reiterated the UN's support to the Government of Egypt in its fight against terrorism and violent extremism."

The Organisation of Islamic Cooperation (OIC) condemned in the strongest possible terms the terrorist attack. OIC Secretary-General Yousef al-Othaimeen, in a statement described the attack as a cowardly and heinous. He stressed the solidarity of the OIC with the Egyptian government in face of terrorism.

See also 
 Sinai terror attacks
 2017 Sinai mosque attack
 Comprehensive Operation – Sinai 2018
 Refuting ISIS
 Defeating ISIS

References

External links 
 Remembering 103 battalion’s brave battle against IS in Sinai — Daily News Egypt
 Sinai residents, clans denounce Rafah terrorist attack — Egypt Today

2017 in Egypt
July 2017 crimes in Asia
Mass murder in 2017
Islamic terrorist incidents in 2017
Terrorist incidents in Egypt in 2017
Terrorist incidents in the Sinai Peninsula
Sinai insurgency
War on terror
Counterterrorism
Operations involving special forces
North Sinai Governorate